Manteo Mitchell (born July 6, 1987) is an American sprinter who competes in the 200m, 400m, and  relay. He was a member of the USA team that won the gold medal in the Men's 4×400 metres relay (splitting 45.7) at the 2012 IAAF World Indoor Championships.

Early life

Mitchell was born in Shelby, North Carolina to Dianna Ellis. He attended Crest High School, being named all-conference, all-region, and all-state his junior and senior years. He then enrolled at Western Carolina University on an athletic scholarship, setting school records in the 400m,  relay, and  relay. Mitchell also led the Catamounts to 5 indoor and outdoor championships, being named the MVP  multiple years.

Professional career

At the 2012 United States Olympic Trials, Mitchell qualified for the Olympic team by finishing fifth in the 400 metres with a time of 44.96, which qualified him to run in the 4x400 metres relay as a member of the U.S. relay team.  At the 2012 Summer Olympics held in London, Mitchell ran the first leg of the heat for the 4x400 metres relay and revealed afterwards that he broke his left fibula at the 200m mark. Despite this, Manteo finished his lap and clocked a time of 45.7, and the American team was able to qualify for the final. Mitchell later earned a silver medal after the American team placed second in the final.

He is also a bobsledder for Team USA, seeking to become just the 6th person in history - first African-American male to medal in both the Summer and Winter Olympic Games.

Personal life

Mitchell currently resides in Asheville, North Carolina. He has one son, Khi Avery, born in 2012.

Personal bests

100 m: 10.04 s (wind: -0.1 m/s) –  Cullowhee, North Carolina 2010
200 m: 20.20 s (wind: +1.7 m/s) –  Eugene, Oregon 2012
400 m: 44.96 s –  Eugene, Oregon, 2012

References

External links
 

1987 births
Living people
American male sprinters
Athletes (track and field) at the 2012 Summer Olympics
Olympic silver medalists for the United States in track and field
Medalists at the 2012 Summer Olympics
USA Indoor Track and Field Championships winners
World Athletics Indoor Championships winners